Začnimo znova (Let's start again) is a Slovenian television family comedy series directed by Vojko Anzlejc and written by Vojka Anzeljc, Miha Čelarja, Thomas Grubar and Miran Mate. The music is composed by Miha Stabej. It was shown on TV Slovenia.

The main characters

2007 Slovenian television series debuts
Radiotelevizija Slovenija original programming